Reedtown may refer to:

Reedtown, Ohio, an unincorporated community in Seneca County
Reedtown, Virginia, an unincorporated community in Northampton County